Brachydesmiella is a genus of Ascomycote fungus, one of many Ascomycota genera classified as incertae sedis.

Species 
Species accepted within Brachydesmiella include:

 Brachydesmiella anthostomelloidea
 Brachydesmiella biseptata
 Brachydesmiella biseptata
 Brachydesmiella brasiliensis
 Brachydesmiella caudate
 Brachydesmiella eugecapiellana
 Brachydesmiella obclavata
 Brachydesmiella orientalis
 Brachydesmiella verrucosa

References

Further reading
Grandi, Rosely A. Piccolo, and Thacyana de Valois Silva. "Hyphomycetes sobre folhas em decomposição de Caesalpinia echinata Lam.: ocorrências novas para o Brasil." Revista Brasileira de Botânica 26.4 (2003): 489–493.
Marques, Marcos Fabio Oliveira, et al. "Cryptophiale and Cryptophialoidea (conidial fungi) from Brazil and keys to the genera." Brazilian Journal of Botany31.2 (2008): 339–344.
Fabio Oliveira Marques, Marcos, and Leonor Orientador Costa Maia. "Fungos conidiais associados à decomposição de substratos vegetais em fragmento de Mata Atlântica, Serra da Jibóia, Bahia." (2007).

Ascomycota enigmatic taxa